Jaypee Sports City, located on the Yamuna Expressway in Greater Noida, NCR, is India's first planned city developed and aimed for sports. 
It's 5000 acres of area comprises various sports venues like international standard cricket stadium, a hockey stadium and an international circuit for F1 races.

Football

Cricket
A cricket stadium is under construction. When completed, it will seat 40,000 spectators, with a planned expansion to a capacity of 100,000. Cricket Stadium will be given a face lift similar to Lord's Cricket Ground. The stadium scheduled to be ready in 2022. The stadium will conform to norms and specifications prescribed by ICC with associated amenities like media and corporate boxes, medical facilities, merchandise stores, a food court, an information kiosk and many others.

Hockey
There will also be a hockey stadium with a sports training academy and infrastructure for other sports.

Racing
Buddh International Circuit hosted India's first ever F1 Grand Prix in 2011. It was the seventeenth round of the 2011 Formula One season and the first Formula One Grand Prix to take place on the Indian subcontinent and even the circuit is the first of its kind in South Asia.
The second Formula One Indian Grand Prix was held in October 2012 which was won by Red Bull Racing Driver Sebastian Vettel, his second consecutive win. The third Formula One Indian Grand Prix was held in October 2013 which was also won by Red Bull Driver Sebastian Vettel, his third consecutive win in India.

Other
Apart from sports there will be Financial Centre, Entertainment Centre, Education Centre, Residential area and Civil Centre for commercial / retail / residential uses.

References

External links
UP to get one more cricket stadium by 2011

Sports venues in Uttar Pradesh
Cricket grounds in Uttar Pradesh
Jaypee Group
Proposed populated places
Stadiums under construction
Sport in Noida
Motorsport venues in India
Indian Grand Prix
Field hockey in Uttar Pradesh
Field hockey venues in India
Noida
Sports venues under construction